Carolyn McGinn (born January 27, 1959) is a Republican member of the Kansas Senate, representing the 31st district since 2005. She used to be a Commissioner on the Sedgwick County Commission.

Committee assignments
McGinn serves on these legislative committees
 Joint Committee on Energy and Environmental Policy (chair)
 Natural Resources (chair)
 Joint Committee on Home and Community Based Services Oversight (chair)
 Ways and Means (vice-chair)
 Joint Committee on Kansas Security
 Local Government
 Calendar and Rules
 Utilities

Major donors
Some of the top contributors to McGinn's 2008 campaign, according to  OpenSecrets, were:
 Kansas Republican Senatorial Committee, Kansas Department of Administration, Koch Industries, Kansas Chamber of Commerce & Industry, Kansas Optometric Association

Energy & natural resources interests were her largest donor group.

In 2012, seven of eight moderate state senate Republicans were successfully targeted by the Koch brothers and the Kansas Chamber of Commerce, with only McGinn escaping defeat in the Republican primary. That gave incumbent Governor Sam Brownback the margin he needed to effectively restructure state taxation, exempting "S" status filers such as Koch Industries from income taxes.

References

External links
Kansas Senate
Project Vote Smart profile
 Follow the Money campaign contributions
 2004, 2006, 2008
 Carolyn McGinn's website

Republican Party Kansas state senators
Living people
1959 births
21st-century American politicians
Women state legislators in Kansas
21st-century American women politicians
Friends University alumni
Wichita State University alumni
County commissioners in Kansas